Dorud County is in Lorestan province, Iran. The capital of the county is the city of Dorud. At the 2006 census, the county's population was 159,026 in 36,687 households. The following census in 2011 counted 162,800 people in 42,815 households. At the 2016 census, the county's population was 174,508 in 50,140 households.

Administrative divisions

The population history of Dorud County's administrative divisions over three consecutive censuses is shown in the following table. The latest census shows two districts, five rural districts, and two cities.

References

 

Counties of Lorestan Province